is a Japanese professional mixed martial artist and current Welterweight King Of Pancrase.

He is the twin brother of professional wrestler Takeshi "Go" Sato.

Mixed martial arts career

Japan
Sato has been a follower of Kazushi Sakuraba. Sato left the Takada Dojo with Sakuraba in April 2006, and was one of the initial members of the gym Laughter7 that was founded by Sakuraba in September 2007.

Sato made his professional MMA debut in December 2004 when he fought and won three times in the Deep 2004 Future King tournament.  Over the next five years, he fought in several organizations in Japan including Cage Force, Demolition, K-1 Hero's, Pancrase and Sengoku, where he faced Joe Doerksen at Sengoku 10.

In 2009 and 2010, Sato fought against Izuru Takeuchi and Yuki Kondo for the Pancrase middleweight championship, resulting in a draw and loss respectively. A year later in 2011, he faced Kengo Ura for the title again and won.  He successfully defended the belt six times before joining the Ultimate Fighting Championship.

Ultimate Fighting Championship
Sato made his UFC debut against Erick Silva on February 15, 2014 at UFC Fight Night 36, replacing an injured Nate Loughran. He lost the fight via TKO early in the first round.

Sato faced Hyun Gyu Lim on September 20, 2014 at UFC Fight Night 52. He lost the fight via TKO in the first round and was subsequently released from the organization.

Championships and accomplishments
Mixed martial arts

Pancrase
Welterweight King of Pancrase (One time)
Six Successful Title Defenses
Deep
Deep 2004 –82 kg class Future King tournament winner

Mixed martial arts record

|-
| Loss
| align=center| 19–12–7 (2)
| Arman Tsarukyan
| Decision (unanimous)
| MFP 214 - Governor's Cup 2017
| 
| align=center| 3
| align=center| 5:00
| Khabarovsk, Russia
|
|-
| NC
| align=center| 19–11–7 (2)
| Sung Chan Hong
| NC (accidental kick to the groin)
| TFC 15 - Top FC 15
| 
| align=center| 5
| align=center| N/A
| Seoul, South Korea
|
|-
| NC
| align=center| 19–11–7 (1)
| Sung Chan Hong
| NC (kick to the groin)
| TFC 12 - Top FC 12
| 
| align=center| 1
| align=center| N/A
| Seoul, South Korea
|
|-
| Win
| align=center| 19–11–7
| Kyung Soo Park
| Submission (armbar)
| Kunlun Fight - Cage Fight Series 5 / Top FC 11
| 
| align=center| 1
| align=center| 1:30
| Seoul, South Korea
| 
|-
| Loss
| align=center| 18–11–7
| Han Seul Kim
| Decision (unanimous)
| TOP FC 10
| 
| align=center| 3
| align=center| 5:00
| Seoul, South Korea
| 
|-
| Win
| align=center| 18–10–7
| Chad Reiner
| Submission (armlock)
| PRO Fighting 10
| 
| align=center| 1
| align=center| 2:20
| Taipei, Taiwan
| 
|-
| Loss
| align=center| 17–10–7
| Hyun Gyu Lim
| TKO (elbows)
| UFC Fight Night: Hunt vs. Nelson
| 
| align=center| 1
| align=center| 1:18
| Saitama, Japan
| 
|-
| Loss
| align=center| 17–9–7
| Erick Silva
| TKO (punches)
| UFC Fight Night: Machida vs. Mousasi
| 
| align=center| 1 
| align=center| 0:52
| Jaraguá do Sul, Brazil
| 
|-
| Win
| align=center| 17–8–7
| Islam Galayev
| Submission (kimura)
| Deep: Tribe Tokyo Fight
| 
| align=center| 2
| align=center| 2:08
| Tokyo, Japan
| 
|-
| Win
| align=center| 16–8–7
| Shingo Suzuki
| Submission (keylock)
| Pancrase: 247
| 
| align=center| 3
| align=center| 2:36
| Tokyo, Japan
| 
|-
| Draw
| align=center| 15–8–7
| Akihiro Murayama
| Draw (unanimous)
| Pancrase: 246
| 
| align=center| 3
| align=center| 5:00
| Tokyo, Japan
| 
|-
| Win
| align=center| 15–8–6
| Keiichiro Yamamiya
| Decision (unanimous)
| Pancrase: Progress Tour 10
| 
| align=center| 3
| align=center| 5:00
| Tokyo, Japan
| 
|-
| Win
| align=center| 14–8–6
| Kiichi Kunimoto
| Decision (unanimous)
| Pancrase: Progress Tour 3
| 
| align=center| 3
| align=center| 5:00
| Tokyo, Japan
| 
|-
| Draw
| align=center| 13–8–6
| Eiji Ishikawa
| Draw (split)
| Pancrase: Impressive Tour 10
| 
| align=center| 3
| align=center| 5:00
| Tokyo, Japan
| 
|-
| Win
| align=center| 13–8–5
| Sojiro Orui
| Decision (unanimous)
| Pancrase: Impressive Tour 5
| 
| align=center| 3
| align=center| 5:00
| Tokyo, Japan
| 
|-
| Win
| align=center| 12–8–5
| Kengo Ura
| Technical Submission (kimura)
| Pancrase: Impressive Tour 1
| 
| align=center| 1
| align=center| 4:40
| Tokyo, Japan
| 
|-
| Win
| align=center| 11–8–5
| Shingo Suzuki
| Decision (unanimous)
| Pancrase: Passion Tour 11
| 
| align=center| 3
| align=center| 5:00
| Tokyo, Japan
| 
|-
| Win
| align=center| 10–8–5
| Yuta Nakamura
| Submission (kimura)
| Pancrase: Passion Tour 9
| 
| align=center| 2
| align=center| 0:34
| Tokyo, Japan
| 
|-
| Loss
| align=center| 9–8–5
| Keiichiro Yamamiya
| Decision (majority)
| Pancrase: Passion Tour 3
| 
| align=center| 2
| align=center| 5:00
| Tokyo, Japan
| 
|-
| Loss
| align=center| 9–7–5
| Yuki Kondo
| Decision (unanimous)
| Pancrase: Passion Tour 1
| 
| align=center| 3
| align=center| 5:00
| Tokyo, Japan
| 
|-
| Loss
| align=center| 9–6–5
| Joe Doerksen
| TKO (punches)
| World Victory Road Presents: Sengoku 10
| 
| align=center| 2
| align=center| 4:27
| Saitama, Japan
| 
|-
| Draw
| align=center| 9–5–5
| Izuru Takeuchi
| Draw
| Pancrase: Changing Tour 4
| 
| align=center| 3
| align=center| 5:00
| Tokyo, Japan
| 
|-
| Win
| align=center| 9–5–4
| Hoon Kim
| Submission (armbar)
| Pancrase: Changing Tour 3
| 
| align=center| 1
| align=center| 4:26
| Tokyo, Japan
| 
|-
| Win
| align=center| 8–5–4
| Ichiro Kanai
| Decision (majority)
| Pancrase: Changing Tour 2
| 
| align=center| 2
| align=center| 5:00
| Tokyo, Japan
| 
|-
| Win
| align=center| 7–5–4
| Rikuhei Fujii
| Decision (unanimous)
| Cage Force EX Eastern Bound
| 
| align=center| 3
| align=center| 5:00
| Tokyo, Japan
| 
|-
| Win
| align=center| 6–5–4
| Yuji Hisamatsu
| Decision (unanimous)
| Pancrase: Shining 8
| 
| align=center| 2
| align=center| 5:00
| Tokyo, Japan
| 
|-
| Loss
| align=center| 5–5–4
| Young Choi
| Decision (majority)
| Deep: 36 Impact
| 
| align=center| 2
| align=center| 5:00
| Osaka, Japan
| 
|-
| Draw
| align=center| 5–4–4
| Masahiro Toryu
| Draw
| Pancrase: Shining 2
| 
| align=center| 2
| align=center| 5:00
| Tokyo, Japan
| 
|-
| Loss
| align=center| 5–4–3
| Yukiya Naito
| TKO (doctor stoppage)
| Cage Force 5
| 
| align=center| 1
| align=center| 4:45
| Tokyo, Japan
| 
|-
| Win
| align=center| 5–3–3
| Kenji Nagai
| Submission (armbar)
| K-1 HERO's: Tournament Final
| 
| align=center| 1
| align=center| 2:46
| Kanagawa, Japan
| 
|-
| Draw
| align=center| 4–3–3
| Yuji Hisamatsu
| Draw
| Cage Force 3
| 
| align=center| 2
| align=center| 5:00
| Tokyo, Japan
| 
|-
| Loss
| align=center| 4–3–2
| Yusaku Tsukumo
| KO (punch)
| Demolition
| 
| align=center| 2
| align=center| 0:18
| Tokyo, Japan
| 
|-
| Draw
| align=center| 4–2–2
| Tetsuo Seto
| Draw
| Demolition
| 
| align=center| 2
| align=center| 5:00
| Tokyo, Japan
| 
|-
| Draw
| align=center| 4–2–1
| Ken Hamamura
| Draw
| Deep: 20th Impact
| 
| align=center| 2
| align=center| 5:00
| Tokyo, Japan
| 
|-
| Loss
| align=center| 4–2
| Ken Hamamura
| TKO (punches)
| Deep: clubDeep Toyama: Barbarian Festival 2
| 
| align=center| 1
| align=center| 0:21
| Toyama, Japan
| 
|-
| Win
| align=center| 4–1
| Marlon Medeiros
| TKO (punches)
| Deep: Hero 1
| 
| align=center| 1
| align=center| 4:21
| Aichi, Japan
| 
|-
| Loss
| align=center| 3–1
| Kosuke Umeda
| TKO (corner stoppage)
| Deep: 18th Impact
| 
| align=center| 1
| align=center| 0:35
| Tokyo, Japan
| 
|-
| Win
| align=center| 3–0
| Moriyuki Yamada
| Decision (unanimous)
| Deep: 17th Impact
| 
| align=center| 2
| align=center| 5:00
| Tokyo, Japan
| 
|-
| Win
| align=center| 2–0
| Ryo Nakajima
| TKO (punches)
| Deep: 17th Impact
| 
| align=center| 2
| align=center| 2:03
| Tokyo, Japan
| 
|-
| Win
| align=center| 1–0 
| Shichi Maru
| Submission (Flying Keylock)
| Deep: 17th Impact
| 
| align=center| 2
| align=center| 1:00
| Tokyo, Japan
|

References

External links
 
 

1985 births
Living people
Japanese male mixed martial artists
Welterweight mixed martial artists
Mixed martial artists utilizing catch wrestling
Mixed martial artists utilizing Sumo
Mixed martial artists utilizing judo
People from Akita (city)
Sportspeople from Akita Prefecture
Kunlun Fight MMA Fighters
Ultimate Fighting Championship male fighters